Betty Stöve was the defending champion, but lost in the first round to Terry Holladay.

Virginia Wade won the title by defeating Martina Navratilova 7–5, 5–7, 6–4 in the final.

Seeds

Draw

Draw

References

External links
 Official results archive (ITF)

Toray Sillook Open Singles
1977 Women's Singles
1977 in Japanese tennis